Almaty Metro (Almaty Metropolitenı) is a rapid transit/metro system in Almaty, Kazakhstan.  The first line of the system was opened on 1 December 2011, after more than 23 years of construction. A , two-station extension of the Metro to Moskva station opened on 18 April 2015.

History

Construction of the Almaty Metro began on 7 September 1988 when Kazakhstan was part of the Soviet Union. However, following the collapse of the Soviet Union, funds from Moscow dried up and the new Kazakhstan government was unable to continue construction. Efforts to preserve the already-completed work were made, but the high cost led to the accumulation of large debts to construction workers.

In 2003, the government of Kazakhstan laid out a new development initiative which included government funds for continued construction on the metro. During the Metro's construction the Almaty tram network was wound down and most its routes closed by 2010.

In 2019, work at two metro stations Dostyk and Saryarka was suspended due to corruption against SK Engineering Support LLP, which owns 80% of the shares of Almatymetrokurylys JSC, and a criminal case was initiated.

Construction
By 2005, the construction programme, now under the control of President Nursultan Nazarbayev, received commitments for 72 million tenge for 2006–2008.

In 2007, the tunnel between the Almaly and Abai stations was completed on the night of 24/25 May. The tunnel from Abai towards Baikonur ( in length) was finished at the end of 2007. Another tunnel on this span was finished in the middle of 2008.

The construction cost on the first line is estimated at 101 billion tenge (US$1 billion).

When opened it was the second metro system in Central Asia, and the sixteenth metro in the former Soviet Union region.

Construction on the expansion to Sairan and Moskva stations started in 2011, and opened for service on 18 April 2015, adding another  of route and two stations to the Metro. The next extension was completed in 30 May 2022 with an additional  two stations Sary-Arka and Bauyrzhan Momyshuly.

Architecture 
When designing the stations, the best traditions of architectural design, set by Soviet architects, were continued. Each station is unique and combines high aesthetics, historicism, and national artistic motives. Each station is decorated with a thematic panel that tells about the cultural and historical heritage. When decorating the walls and floors, natural facing granite stones of the Kurdai, Kurta, and Kapal-Arasan deposits of Kazakhstan were used.

Operations
The metro operating hours are daily, from 6:20 to 0:00 (UTC+6). Until January 4, 2012, the metro worked from 6:00 to 0:00 (UTC + 6). 

It runs from Rayymbek Ave. in a southerly direction under Nazarbayev Ave. (former Furmanov St.) to Abai Ave, and further along it in a westerly direction to Altynsarin Ave. The line runs seven four-car trains. The traffic interval is 13 minutes on weekends, and 10 minutes on weekdays during inter-peak hours, during peak hours it is reduced to 8 minutes. The travel time for the first stage of the first line is approximately 16 minutes. The rolling stock is modern trains manufactured by the South Korean concern Hyundai with a through passage, air conditioning in the carriages, full autopilot mode and other features. 

The Metro expanded  with an additional  extension to Sary-Arka and Baurzhan Momyshuly and was completed in May 2022.

The Almaty Metro owns fifteen four-car trainsets made by Hyundai Rotem. Because of this, they have many similarities to  metro trains in South Korea, as well as the Canada Line units in Vancouver, Canada. It is one of only two metros in the former Soviet Union to have never used the 81/717-714, the other being Kazan (although a derivative model is used in that case), one of only two to use trains not built by a Russian company, the other being Minsk, using trains built by the Swiss company Stadler (in the future, Kharkiv will also have this title), and the only to have never used trains built by such companies. The reason for building differently was because their needs did not line up with what Metrowagonmash was offering at the time.

Fare 
The fare is paid using contactless reusable smart cards and disposable smart tokens. The cost of one trip is 80 tenge, since the summer of 2012 for children from 7-15 years old the cost is 40 tenge upon presentation of a birth certificate. The cost of a smart card without a balance is 100 tenge. The balance of smart cards can be replenished through cash desks and automated terminals at the stations. The validity of the card is 3 years. The token is valid until the end of the current day. Wednesday is declared "token day". On this day, passengers can bring their expired tokens and use them.

In addition to the above types of payment, since 2016, payment in the metro has also been made by the ONAI card system and contactless payment cards, for which separate turnstiles have been installed.

Passenger numbers

12.4 million passengers used the metro in 2016, an increase on the 10.6 million who used it in 2015. Daily passenger numbers varied from 17,000 per day on Saturdays, Sundays and public holidays to up to 45,000 people who used it on working days.

After opening of Saryarqa and Momyshuly stations in May 2022, daily ridership increased to 80 thousand passengers on weekdays and up to 60 thousand - on weekends.

Future plans
The  extension to Kalkaman and Western Bus Station is predicted for completion in 2025.

Incidents

Death of a worker - February 2006 
In February, a worker died at the construction of the subway. At about 9 a.m., worker Ali Sulekbayev fell under the wheels of a KamAZ. The 22-year-old Sulekbayev was an employee of AlmatyMetroKurylys JSC. "The KAMAZ was not registered with the traffic police.

Ground collapse on 9 August 2008 
On 9 August 2008, around 5 p.m., there was a collapse of soil from the surface into the tunnel of the subway under construction at the intersection of Abay Avenue and Gagarin Street. From the nearby construction excavation soon arrived subway builders and KamAZ trucks, loaded with earth, began to fill in the landslide.

On 12 August, the head of Almatymetrokurylys JSC Murat Ukshebaev did not meet with journalists. According to some reports, the supports were installed at a distance of 20 meters instead of the projected 4 meters.

On 16 August, the directorate of Almatymetrokurylys JSC announced the official conclusions of the commission: "The soils of the area are represented by the soil-vegetation layer, bulk soils, loam and pebbles. The green stripe separating Gagarin Ave in summer time is systematically irrigated through aryk system. Water, draining, gradually washed the ground. When the humidity of the soil reached a critical point, under its own weight the soil collapsed".

According to Salamat Esimkhanov, Deputy Chief Engineer of the Almaty Metro Construction Directorate: "Soil wetting cannot be the cause of the collapse. The designers studied all the risks. They had all the information about this area, they couldn't have been unaware that water was flowing or there were any communications there.

The head of JSC Almatymetrokurylys, Murat Ukshebaev, refused all comments on this topic.

Construction gallery

Network Map

See also
 List of metro systems
 Trams in Almaty
 Almaty Light Rail

References

External links

 KGP Metro Almaty – official site
 Almaty Metro Track Map
 Almaty Metro at UrbanRail.net
 Almaty Metro at Subways.net
 English Guide to the Almaty Metro
  The Atlantic Cities - In Kazakhstan, A Beautiful, Futuristic New Subway System

 
 
Railway lines opened in 2011
2011 establishments in Kazakhstan